Palantla Chinantec, also known as Chinanteco de San Pedro Tlatepuzco, is a major Chinantecan language of Mexico, spoken in San Juan Palantla and a couple dozen neighboring towns in northern Oaxaca. The variety of San Mateo Yetla, known as Valle Nacional Chinantec, has marginal mutual intelligibility.

A grammar and a dictionary have been published.

Phonology

Vowels 

Close vowels /i u/ typically are articulated as more open [ɪ ʊ] and are realized as more closed when represented by different tones. The close back vowel /ɯ/ tends to be articulated as [ə] when present in vowel clusters following /u/, or when preceding the /j/ consonant, and may also have a higher central sound. The mid back vowel /ɤ/ tends to be articulated as [ɜ] or [ɨ] when preceding a /w/ consonant. The low central vowel /a/ tends to be realized as [ɐ] following /i/ when one of the consonants /t l n/ occurs.

Each vowel can be nasalized as /ĩ ɯ̃ ũ ɛ̃ ɤ̃ õ ã/. The language is unusual in having, for some speakers, a three-way contrast between non-nasalized, lightly nasalized, and heavily nasalized vowels.

Stress tones may include either high or low /v́ v̀/ tones.

Consonants

References

Chinantec languages